The City v Country Patriotic Match was a one-off all-star game between two representative sides organised by the South Australian National Football League, following the cancellation of an interstate match between South Australia and Victoria in 1940.  Admission to the ground was set at ninepence and 1 6 to the grandstand, children threepence and sixpence, with profits donated to the Navy League of Australia.
  
The match was played on 3 August 1940 at Adelaide Oval, between the Country Team (Country) and the Metropolitan Team (City). City won the match by 27 points.

Teams

The teams were selected from SANFL footballers by the State football selectors; C. McArthur, T.R.L. Alderman, and Sergeant C.L Shea of the 2nd A.I.F.

Country Team 

Colours: Red and Black

Colin Smith (West Adelaide) was initially selected as Vice Captain but dropped out of the team on the day of the match, along with J. Reilly (North Adelaide) and Jack Furniss (North Adelaide), who were replaced with Jack Oatey, Angus Strauss and Theo Chynoweth.

Metropolitan Team 

Colours: Blue and White

Lionel Bennetts (North Adelaide) dropped out of the originally selected team, to be replaced by Mel Brock (Glenelg)

Best on ground award 
Whilst there was no official award presented for the player judged best afield, Jack Oatey's performance was singled out in multiple accounts as the best performed player in the game.

Scorecard

See also
1940 SANFL season

References

Australian rules football games
History of Australian rules football
1940 in Australian rules football
August 1940 sports events